A Esposa do Solteiro (also known as La mujer de medianoche) is a 1926 Brazilian film directed by Carlo Campogalliani. It was Carmen Miranda's first film. It is believed to be a lost film.

Cast 
Paulo Benedetti
Carlo Campogalliani ... Jorge Peirada
Amália de Oliveira
Polly de Viana
Bastos Estefânio
Augusto Gonçalves ... Mena
Luiz Lizman
Lia Lupini
Letizia Quaranta
Alberto Sereno
Ivo Soares
Luiza Valle
Carmen Miranda

References

External links

Lost Brazilian films
1926 films
1920s Portuguese-language films
Films set in Rio de Janeiro (city)
Films set in Buenos Aires
Brazilian romantic drama films
Brazilian silent films
Brazilian black-and-white films
1926 romantic drama films
Silent romantic drama films